The Muntinlupa–Cavite Expressway (MCX), signed as E2 of the Philippine expressway network, is a  controlled-access toll expressway linking the southern province of Cavite to Muntinlupa in the Philippines. It is currently the shortest expressway in the Philippines, connecting the South Luzon Expressway to the Daang Hari Road and Daang Reyna Road near Las Piñas and Bacoor. It is owned by the Department of Public Works and Highways and operated by MCX Tollway Inc., a subsidiary of Ayala Corporation's AC Infrastructure Holdings Corporation.

The expressway was opened to traffic on July 24, 2015.

Route description
Muntinlupa–Cavite Expressway acts as a connector between Daang Hari and South Luzon Expressway. The expressway passes near the vicinity of New Bilibid Prisons and Southville 2A, one of the relocation areas of informal settlers who once lived beside the Philippine National Railways line.

The expressway starts with a T-interchange with South Luzon Expressway near Susana Heights. It follows a slight curving route paralleling Magdaong River, which acts as a boundary between barangays Poblacion and Tunasan. It soon passes near the New Bilibid Prisons, where several access roads are rerouted with the construction of the expressway. The expressway ends as a roundabout with Daang Hari, Daang Reyna, and Biazon Road.

Toll

Tolls are assessed in each direction at the toll barrier, based on class. An interoperability agreement signed by the operators of Muntinlupa–Cavite and South Luzon Expressways was signed three days before the formal opening of the former. The result of the agreement is that motorists using the Muntinlupa–Cavite Expressway will have to pay a toll fee depending on the vehicle class in addition to the toll fee from the South Luzon Expressway or Skyway to Susana Heights Exit. Eastbound vehicles opting to pay in cash are given tickets at MCX Toll Plaza and will pay their toll fees upon exit from SLEX or STAR Tollway or at Skyway Main Toll Plaza. In accordance with law, all toll rates include a 12% value-added tax.

The expressway implements an electronic toll collection (ETC) system, using the RFID-based Autosweep. The ETC system is shared with SMC Infrastructure tollways such as SLEX, Skyway, STAR Tollway, NAIAX, and TPLEX.

Source: Toll Regulatory Board

Exits

Notes

References

External links 

Toll roads in the Philippines
Roads in Metro Manila